The 2003–04 Kentucky Wildcats men's basketball team represented the University of Kentucky in the 2003–04  college basketball season led by head coach Tubby Smith. Although the team earned a #1 seed in the NCAA tournament, they were upset by the University of Alabama at Birmingham in the second round.

Roster

Schedule and results

|-
!colspan=9 style=| Non-conference regular season

|-
!colspan=9 style=| SEC Regular Season

|-
!colspan=9 style=| 2004 SEC Tournament

|-
!colspan=9 style=| 2004 NCAA Tournament

References

External links
Kentucky Basketball Official Site 

Kentucky Wildcats men's basketball seasons
Kentucky
Kentucky
Kentucky Wildcats men's b
Kentucky Wildcats men's b